Predrag Laković (28 March 1929 – 9 September 1997) was a Serbian actor. He appeared in more than one hundred films from 1953 to 1997.

Selected filmography

References

External links 

1929 births
1997 deaths
Male actors from Skopje
Serbian male film actors